Jindal India Thermal Power Limited is power producing company incorporated to set-up thermal power plants in India.  It was established in New Delhi in 2006.

See also 
Angul Thermal Power Station

References

External links
 JITPL

Electric power companies of India
Energy companies established in 2006
Indian companies established in 2006
Companies based in New Delhi
2006 establishments in Delhi